This is a list of diplomatic missions of Trinidad and Tobago, excluding honorary consulates. Trinidad and Tobago is a twin island country located in the southernmost end of the Caribbean. 

In February 2020 the two Heads of Government for both the Republic of Trinidad and Tobago and Barbados initialed several agreements including one which would see the sharing of various chanceries around the world.

Current missions

Africa

Americas

Asia

Europe

Multilateral organisations

Gallery

Closed missions

Africa

Americas

See also
 Foreign relations of Trinidad and Tobago
 List of diplomatic missions in Trinidad and Tobago
 Visa policy of Trinidad and Tobago

Notes

References

External links
Ministry of Foreign Affairs of Trinidad and Tobago
Trinidad and Tobago High Commission in Ottawa, Canada
Trinidad and Tobago High Commission in Abuja, Nigeria
Trinidad and Tobago High Commission in Kingston, Jamaica
Embassy of Trinidad and Tobago in Washington D.C., United States
Trinidad and Tobago High Commission in London, United Kingdom
Consulate-General of Trinidad and Tobago in New York, United States
Consulate-General of Trinidad and Tobago in Toronto, Canada
Consulate-General of Trinidad and Tobago in Miami, United States

Diplomatic missions
Trinidad